On the technical analysis chart, a wedge pattern is a market trend commonly found in traded assets (stocks, bonds, futures, etc.). The pattern is characterized by a contracting range in prices coupled with an upward trend in prices (known as a rising wedge) or a downward trend in prices (known as a falling wedge).

A wedge pattern is considered to be a pattern which is forming at the top or bottom of the trend. It is a type of formation in which trading activities are confined within converging straight lines which form a pattern. It should take about 3 to 4 weeks to complete the wedge. This pattern has a rising or falling slant pointing in the same direction. It differs from the triangle in the sense that both boundary lines either slope up or down. Price breaking out point creates another difference from the triangle.  Falling and rising wedges are a small part of intermediate or major trend. As they are reserved for minor trends, they are not considered to be major patterns. Once that basic or primary trend resumes itself, the wedge pattern loses its effectiveness as a technical indicator.

Falling wedge 

The falling wedge pattern is characterized by a chart pattern which forms when the market makes lower lows and lower highs with a contracting range. When this pattern is found in a downward trend, it is considered a reversal pattern, as the contraction of the range indicates the downtrend is losing steam. When this pattern is found in an uptrend, it is considered a bullish pattern, as the market range becomes narrower into the correction, indicating that the downward trend is losing strength and the resumption of the uptrend is in the making.

In a falling wedge, both boundary lines slant down from left to right. The upper descends at a steeper angle than the lower line. Volume keeps on diminishing and trading activity slows down due to narrowing prices. There comes the breaking point, and trading activity after the breakout differs. Once prices move out of the specific boundary lines of a falling wedge, they are more likely to move sideways and saucer-out before they resume the basic trend.

Rising wedge 

The rising wedge pattern is characterized by a chart pattern which forms when the market makes higher highs and higher lows with a contracting range. When this pattern is found in an uptrend, it is considered a reversal pattern, as the contraction of the range indicates that the uptrend is losing strength. When this pattern is found in a downtrend, it is considered a bearish pattern, as the market range becomes narrower into the correction, indicating that the correction is losing strength, and that the resumption of the downtrend is in the making.

In a rising wedge, both boundary lines slant up from left to right. Although both lines point in the same direction, the lower line rises at a steeper angle than the upper one. Prices usually decline after breaking through the lower boundary line. As far as volumes are concerned, they keep on declining with each new price advance or wave up, indicating that the demand is weakening at the higher price level. A rising wedge is more reliable when found in a bearish market. In a bullish trend what seems to be a Rising Wedge may actually be a Flag or a Pennant (stepbrother of a wedge) requiring about 4 weeks to complete.

External links 
 Analyzing Chart Patterns: The Wedge at investopedia.com

Chart patterns